Riyahi ( [];  Riyâhi), also variously rendered in English as Reyahi, Riahi, Riahy or Ryahi, or with the Arabic definite article ar-Riyahi ( []), also rendered as Ereyahi, may refer to:
al-Hurr ibn Yazid ar-Riyahi
Reda Ereyahi
Ali Riahi
Djahanguir Riahi
Mohammad-Amin Riahi
Shahla Riahi
Taghi Riahi